Jean-Antoine Louis known as "Louis du Bas-Rhin" (10 March 1742 in Bar-le-Duc – 1796), was a municipal functionary from  Strasbourg.

He was employed under the Intendant of Alsace when the French Revolution began.  He rapidly adopted the new ideas.

During the Revolution 

During the National Assembly, Louis served as an administrator and member of the Directory of the Département of Bas-Rhin in 1791.
Elected deputy to the Convention for the département of Bas-Rhin (1792, he voted for the death of Louis XVI.  Elected to Committee of General Security in October 1793.  With Jean-Adam Pflieger, sent as Representative on a Mission to Alsace from March to July 1793. He served as President of the Convention from 5 July 1794 to 19 July 1794.  It was the last complete term of office for a President before the end of the French Terror.

With the fall of Maximilien Robespierre 9 Thermidor he was released from his duties on the Committee of General Security.  In his tenure on the committee he gained a reputation as one of the more accommodating, sympathetic members.

Under the Directory 

Elected deputy to Council of Five Hundred, he died before he could attend a session.

References

Sources 
 Révolution française de Jules Michelet

1742 births
1796 deaths
Deputies to the French National Convention
People from Bar-le-Duc
Regicides of Louis XVI
Members of the Council of Five Hundred